Jevan Paul Anderson (born 3 March 2000) is a Scottish professional footballer who plays as a defender for Elgin City. He has previously played for Burton Albion, Hereford, Kettering Town and Cove Rangers.

Career
After playing for Aberdeen and Formartine United, he signed a one-year contract with Burton Albion in July 2019, following an earlier trial with Fleetwood Town. He made his first-team debut for Burton Albion on 3 September 2019 in the EFL Trophy, and his Football League debut on 5 October 2019. He moved on loan to Hereford in January 2020, making 7 league appearances. On 4 December 2020, Anderson joined National League North club Kettering Town on loan until 1 January 2021. This loan was then extended until 29 January 2021.

On 12 May 2021 it was announced that he would be one of 12 players leaving Burton at the end of the season. Anderson then signed with Scottish League One club Cove Rangers. On 24 February 2022, Anderson joined Scottish League Two side Elgin City on loan for the remainder of the 2021–22 season. On 31 May 2022, Anderson signed a two-year contract with Elgin City.

Personal life
His father is former footballer Russell Anderson.

References

2000 births
Living people
Scottish footballers
Aberdeen F.C. players
Formartine United F.C. players
Burton Albion F.C. players
Hereford F.C. players
Kettering Town F.C. players
English Football League players
National League (English football) players
Scottish Professional Football League players
Association football defenders
Cove Rangers F.C. players
Elgin City F.C. players